Wamitaksar is a town in Gulmi District part of the Musikot Municipality. At the time of the 1991 Nepal census it had a population of 6421. It serves as the headquarters of the Musikot Municipality.

Gallery

References

External links
UN map of the municipalities of Gulmi District

Populated places in Gulmi District
Towns in Nepal